The following is a list of 2004 box office number-one films in Japan. When the number-one film in gross is not the same as the number-one film in admissions, both are listed.

References

2004
2004 in Japanese cinema
Japan